The NBA D-League All-Star Game Most Valuable Player (MVP) was an annual NBA Development League (D-League) award given since the 2006–07 season to the 2016–17 season to the player voted best of the annual All-Star Game. The inaugural D-League All-Star Game was held in February 2007, and the inaugural All-Star Game MVP was Fort Worth Flyers forward Pops Mensah-Bonsu of the East team. By position, guards dominated the award with five winners, followed by forwards and centers with three each.

In 2018, the All-Star was replaced by the International Challenge and the Midseason All-NBA G League Team, and thus the All-Star Game MVP Award was retired.

Winners

See also
NBA G League Most Valuable Player Award
NBA All-Star Game Kobe Bryant Most Valuable Player Award

References

National Basketball Association lists
All-Star Game Most Valuable Player
Awards established in 2007
Basketball most valuable player awards
National Basketball Association most valuable player awards